Lesbianism is the sexual and romantic desire between women. There are historically far fewer mentions of lesbianism than male homosexuality, due to many historical writings and records focusing primarily on men.

Ancient Mesopotamia
Women's sexuality in ancient Mesopotamia is not well documented, and Stephanie Lynn Budin, writing on love magic, argues that "there remains no evidence for lesbianism in this regard (or any other from Mesopotamia)." However, there are mentions in the Code of Hammurabi (c. 1700 BC) of a gender-nonconforming individual known as a sal-zikrum, or "woman-man", who were allowed to marry other women, and were also able to inherit the same amount as their brothers. It is difficult to ascribe modern notions of gender and sexuality to ancient individuals, but some interpret sal-zikrum as describing "a woman engaged in some kind of priestly functions." It is possible that a female transgressor of gender boundaries was regarded as a "woman-man" because of social behaviors (i.e., relationships with other women).

Another term Sal-nu-bar referred to women who were allowed to marry, but were forbidden to have children, so they brought other women with them to bear children; however, they could have children of their own, but they have to keep it as a secret, or cast them out as Sargon's mother did. In addition, an old Assyrian text indicated that two women, who might have been two widows of a dead father, had a betrothal contract for their "daughter."

Ancient Egypt
Homosexuality in ancient Egypt between women is less often recorded, or alluded to, in documents and other artifacts as compared to homosexuality among men, but it does appear in such document. The Dream Book of the Carlsberg papyrus XIII claims that "If a woman dreams that a woman has intercourse with her, she will come to a bad end." Depictions of women during the New Kingdom suggest they enjoyed, in a relaxed and intimate atmosphere, the company of other women who were scantily clad or naked. Some cosmetics-related items, which may have been owned and used by women, feature nude and suggestive depictions of women.

Ancient Greece
Evidence of female homosexuality in the ancient Greek world is limited. Most surviving sources from the classical period come from Athens, and they are without exception written by men. At least among these Athenian men, the discussion and depiction of female homosexual activity seems to have been taboo. Kenneth Dover suggests that, due to the role played by the phallus in ancient Greek men's conceptions of sexuality, female homosexual love was not explicitly defined as a sexuality or category by the authors of surviving sources.

Nonetheless, there are a few references to female homosexuality in ancient Greek literature. The writing of two poets from the archaic period, Sappho (c. 630 – c. 570 BC) and Alcman (fl. 7th century BC), has been interpreted as concerning female homosexual desire. Alcman wrote hymns known as partheneia, which discuss attraction between young women. Though these hymns are ambiguous, historians have posited that they are erotic or sexual. At roughly the same time, Sappho's poems discuss her love for both men and women. For instance, in Sappho's Ode to Aphrodite, the poet asks Aphrodite for aid in wooing another woman. It is noticeable that the fragment describes Sappho both giving to and receiving sexual contact from the same partner, in contrast with the rigid active/passive partner dichotomy observed in Greek male homosexual relationships. Only one fragment of Sappho's poetry, Sappho 94, contains a clear mention of female homosexual acts.

Sappho is the most often mentioned example of an ancient Greek woman who may have actually engaged in sexual acts with women. Her sexuality has been debated by historians. Some, such as Denys Page, argue that she was attracted to women. Others, such as Eva Stigers, point out that that the descriptions of love between women in Sappho's writings are not necessarily evidence for her own sexuality. Some historians have gone so far as to argue that Sappho's circle were involved in female homosexuality as a kind of initiation ritual. The earliest evidence of Sappho's reputation for homosexual desire comes from the Hellenistic period, with a fragment of a biography found in the Oxyrhynchus Papyri which criticizes Sappho for being "gynaikerastria."

Similarly, some find evidence in Plutarch that Spartan women engaged in homosexual activities, although Plutarch wrote many centuries after classical Greece. In Plutarch's biography of Lycurgus of Sparta, part of his Parallel Lives, the author claims that older Spartan women formed relationships with girls that were similar to the erastes/eromenos relationships that existed between some older and younger male Greeks. Sarah Pomeroy believes that Plutarch's depiction of homosexual relationships between Spartan women is plausible. For instance, Pomeroy argues that homosexual relationships between the girls would have "flourished" in the girls' choirs that performed the partheneia of Alcman.

There are at least two other women poets who wrote in the style of Sappho: Erinna of Teos or Telos (c. late 400s BC) and Nossis of Locri (c. 300 BC). Erinna's Distaff and epigrams lament her childhood friend Baucis in a manner which "contains echoes of Sappho." Nossis of Locri wrote three epigrams in a similar style, one of which bears striking resemblance to the floral eroticism found in Sappho's works. It reads as follows: Nothing is sweeter than desire. All other delights are second.

From my mouth I spit even honey.

Nossis says this, whom Aphrodite does not love,

knows not her flowers, what roses they are. In classical Athens, the idea of homosexual women is briefly mentioned in the Speech of Aristophanes in Plato's Symposium. Later references to female homosexuality in Greek literature include an epigram by Asclepiades, which describes two women who reject Aphrodite's "rules" but instead do "other things which are not seemly". Dover comments on the "striking" hostility shown in the epigram to female homosexuality, contrasting it with Asclepiades' willingness to discuss his own homosexual desire in other works, suggesting that this apparent male anxiety about female homosexuality in ancient Greece is the reason for our paucity of sources discussing it.

In Greek mythology, the story of Callisto has been interpreted as implying that Artemis and Callisto were lovers. The myth of the Amazons has also been interpreted as referring to female homosexual activities.

Female-female relationships or sexual activities were occasionally depicted on Greek art. Fr example, a plate from Archaic Thera appears to show two women courting. An Attic red figure vase in the collection of the Tarquinia National Museum in Italy shows a kneeling woman fingering the genitals of another woman in a rare explicit portrayal of sexual activity between women in Greek art.

Ancient India 
The Arthashastra, an ancient Indian treatise on statecraft likely edited and compiled between the second and third centuries CE, describes the fines individuals must pay for engaging in ayoni, non-vaginal sex. This category includes all non-vaginal sex, whether heterosexual or otherwise. Although both men and women who have sex with each other have to pay a fine, the fine for two women is lower. Overall, "while homosexual sex is unsanctioned" in the Arthashastra, it is also "treated as a minor offense."

The Manusmriti, a first century legal text, places a very small fine upon sex between nonvirgin women; however, one who "manually deflowers a virgin" is sentenced to the loss of two fingers. If two virgins are caught, the 'doer' "has to pay double the girl's dowry and is given ten whiplashes." It is clear that this stemmed from anxiety over the girl's marriage prospects. Notably, the Manusmriti also fails to provide a punishment for mutual oral or manual sex.

Roman Empire, the New Testament, and early Christianity

The lesbian love story between Iphis and Ianthe, in Book IX of Ovid's the Metamorphoses, is most vivid. When Iphis' mother becomes pregnant, her husband declares that he will kill the child if it is a girl. She bears a girl and attempts to conceal her sex by giving her a name that is of ambiguous gender: Iphis. When the "son" is thirteen, the father chooses a golden-haired maiden named Ianthe as the "boy's" bride. The love of the two girls is written sympathetically:

They were of equal age, they both were lovely,Had learned the ABC from the same teachers,And so love came to both of them togetherIn simple innocence, and filled their heartsWith equal longing.

However, as the marriage draws ever closer, Iphis recoils, calling her love "monstrous and unheard of". The goddess Isis hears the girl's moans and turns her into a boy.

References to love between women are sparse. Phaedrus attempts to explain lesbianism through a myth of his own making: Prometheus, coming home drunk from a party, had mistakenly exchanged the genitals of some women and some men. Phaedrus remarks: "Lust now enjoys perverted pleasure."

It is quite clear that paiderastia and lesbianism were not held in equally good light, possibly because of the violation of strict gender roles. Seneca the Elder mentions a husband who killed his wife and her female lover and implies that their crime was worse than that of adultery between a male and female. 

Iamblichus, a Greek novelist from the first century AD, is best known for his Babylonaica, or Babylonian Tales. The Babylonaica contains a side story about "Berenice, who was daughter of the king of Egypt, and about her wild and lawless passions: and how she had relations with Mesopotamia." According to an ancient summary of the episode, Berenice and Mesopotamia (a woman) are wed. Although the Babylonaica mainly deals with a heterosexual couple, Sinonis and Rhodanes, Berenice and Mesopotamia exist as foils for the pair.  Helen Morales cautions that this tale ought not to be treated as "certain evidence...that lesbian marriages were performed in the Roman imperial period," but the mere fact that it exists and survives is remarkable.  

Lucian's Dialogues of the Courtesans contain an episode in which a woman named Megilla renames herself Megillus and wears a wig to cover her shaved head. She marries Demonassa of Corinth, although Megillus is from Lesbos. Her friend Leaena comments that "They say there are women like that in Lesbos, with faces like men, and unwilling to consort with men, but only with women, as though they themselves were men." Megillus seduces Leaena, who feels that the experience is too disgusting to describe in detail. Leila J. Rupp writes in Sapphistries: A Global History of Love Between Women: "Two things are significant in this depiction: the connection of an aggressive woman from Lesbos with masculinity and the portrayal of the seduced as a prostitute."

In another dialogue ascribed to Lucian, two men debate over which is better, male love or heterosexuality. One man protested that if male affairs were legitimized, then lesbianism would soon be condoned as well, an unthinkable notion.

The apocryphal Apocalypse of Peter describes the punishment of both male and female homosexuals in Hell:

Medieval period

Europe
In medieval Europe, the Christian Church took a stricter view of same-sex relations between women. Penitentials, developed by Celtic monks in Ireland, were unofficial guidebooks which became popular, especially in the British Isles. These books listed crimes and the penances that must be done for them. For example, "...he who commits the male crime of the Sodomites shall do penance for four years". The several versions of the Paenitentiale Theodori, attributed to Theodore of Tarsus, who became archbishop of Canterbury in the 7th century, make special references to lesbianism. The Paenitentiale states, "If a woman practices vice with a woman she shall do penance for three years". Penitentials soon spread from the British Isles to mainland Europe. The authors of most medieval penitentials either did not explicitly discuss lesbian activities at all, or treated them as a less serious sin than male homosexuality.

The Old French legal treatise Li livres de jostice et de plet (c. 1260) is the earliest reference to legal punishment for lesbianism akin to that for male homosexuality. It prescribed dismemberment on the first two offences and death by burning for the third: a near exact parallel to the penalty for a man, although what "dismemberment" could mean for a medieval woman is unknown. In Spain, Italy, and the Holy Roman Empire, sodomy between women was included in acts considered unnatural and punishable by burning to death, although few instances are recorded of this taking place. In the Holy Roman Empire under Charles V, a law on sexual offences specifically prohibits sex acts between women.

There exist records of about a dozen women in the medieval period who were involved in lesbian sex, as defined by Judith Bennett as same-sex genital contact. All of these women are known through their involvement with the courts, and were imprisoned or executed. An early example of a woman executed for homosexual acts occurred in 1477, when a girl in Speier, Germany, was drowned. The 16th-century writings of Spanish jurist Antonio Gomez mentions the burning of two nuns for the use of "material instruments".

Not all women were so harshly punished, though. In the early fifteenth century, a Frenchwoman, Laurence, wife of Colin Poitevin, was imprisoned for her affair with another woman, Jehanne. She pleaded for clemency on the grounds that Jehanne had been the instigator and she regretted her sins, and was freed to return home after six months imprisonment. A later example, from Pescia in Italy, involved an abbess, Sister Benedetta Carlini, who was documented in inquests between 1619 and 1623 as having committed grave offences including a passionately erotic love affair with another nun when possessed by a Divine male spirit named "Splenditello". She was declared the victim of a "diabolical obsession" and placed in the convent's prison for the last 35 years of her life.

However, an Italian surgeon, William of Bologna, attributed lesbianism to a "growth emanating from the mouth of the womb and appearing outside the vagina as a pseudopenis."

Arab world
In the medieval Arab world, lesbianism was considered to be caused by heat generated in a woman's labia, which could be alleviated by friction against another woman's genitalia. Medieval Arabic medical texts considered lesbianism to be inborn. For instance, Masawaiyh reported:

Al-Kindi wrote:

The earliest story about lesbianism in Arabic literature comes from the Encyclopedia of Pleasure, and tells the story of the love between a Christian, Hind bint al-Nu'man, and an Arab woman, Hind bint al-Khuss, and we know from the Fihrist, a tenth-century catalogue of works in Arabic, of writings about twelve other lesbian couples which have not survived. In addition, Ahmad al-Tifashi wrote a collection of stories, known as A Promenade of the Hearts, which included some poems on homosexual and lesbian themes. Other accounts which mentioned lesbian relationships, include Allen Edwardes in his The Jewel in the Lotus: A Historical Survey of the Sexual Culture of the East, and Leo Africanus who reported about female diviners in Fez. Moreover, the mutazarrifat (refined courtly ladies, also used for lesbians) were present in the Islamic world such as Wallada bint al-Mustakfi in Al-Andalus, and slave girls (qaynas) who lived in the Abbasid Caliphate. According to the Ali ibn Nasr al-Katib's Encyclopedia of Pleasure, a female poet named Al-Hurqah loved another woman, the legendary Hind bint al-Khuss. When Hind Bint al-Khuss died, her faithful lover "cropped her hair, wore black clothes, rejected worldly pleasures, vowed to God that she would lead an ascetic life until she passed away". Hind bint al-Nu'man even builds a monastery to commemorate her love for al-Zarqāʾ. This source figures the two characters as the first lesbians in Arab culture.

Judaism
Between 1170 and 1180 Maimonides, one of the foremost rabbis in Jewish history, compiled his magnum opus, the Mishneh Torah. It is the only Medieval-era work that details all of Jewish observance, and as regarding lesbianism states:

For women to be mesollelot [women rubbing genitals against each other] with one another is forbidden, as this is the practice of Egypt, which we were warned against: "Like the practice of the land of Egypt ... you shall not do" (Leviticus 18:3). The Sages said [in the midrash of Sifra Aharei Mot 8:8–9], "What did they do? A man married a man, and a woman married a woman, and a woman married two men."

Even though this practice is forbidden, one is not lashed [as for a Torah prohibition] on account of it, since there is no specific prohibition against it, and there is no real intercourse. Therefore, [one who does this] is not forbidden to the priesthood because of harlotry, and a woman is not prohibited to her husband by this, since it is not harlotry. But it is appropriate to administer to them lashings of rebellion [i.e., those given for violation of rabbinic prohibitions], since they did something forbidden. And a man should be strict with his wife in this matter, and should prevent women known to do this from coming to her or from her going to them.

Early modern period

Latin America 
The Florentine Codex, an encyclopedic work on the Aztec and other peoples of Central America finished in 1577, contains a section on Aztec homosexuality. Book ten of the Codex covers both male and female sexuality; Geoffrey Kimball provides a terminology guide to and new translation of this source.  According to Kimball, the context of the Classical Nahuatl term xōchihuah ("owner of flowers") seems to denote a "homosexual of either sex." Another word, patlācheh, seems to refer specifically to a lesbian.

Kimball's translation includes the following excerpt: She is a possessor of arrows; an owner of darts.

She is a possessor of companions, one who pairs off with women,

she is one who makes friends with women, one who provides herself with various young women,

one who possesses various young women.Although the text goes on to include other unflattering descriptions of a woman who has sex with other women, "the invective against the homosexual woman is much less strident against the homosexual man." Kimball adds that the first line of this excerpt "may refer to a woman who violates the sex-role stereotype, or it may have some other reference, at present not yet understood."

Juana Inés de la Cruz (12 November 1648 – 17 April 1695) was a prolific scholar, poet, writer, and protofeminist known for her searing critiques of misogyny. She also "addressed to three vicereines more than forty passionate, often playful, love poems." The romantic nature of these poems has been debated by scholars for decades, but Amanda Powell argues that nonromantic readings of de la Cruz's work stem from historical and modern assumptions of heterosexuality. For example, De la Cruz's Redondilla 87, which rapturously extols the qualities of a woman named "Feliciana," could be read in a homoerotic manner.

Felipa de Souza (1556 – 1600) was a woman who had romantic relationships with other women during the Brazilian colonial era. She was accused of sodomy and because of that she fell victim of the Catholic Inquisition.

The existence of lesbian relationship between Anne Bonny and Mary Read is matter of debate.

Europe 
In early modern England, female homosexual behavior became increasingly culturally visible. Some historians, such as Valerie Traub, have argued that this led to increasing cultural sanctions against lesbian behaviors. For instance, in 1709, Delariviere Manley published The New Atlantis, attacking lesbian activities. However, others, such as Friedli and Faderman have played down the cultural opposition to female homosexuality, pointing out that it was better tolerated than male homosexual activities. Additionally, despite the social stigma, English courts did not prosecute homosexual activities between women, and lesbianism was largely ignored by the law in England. Although Charles Hamilton (female husband), according to Henry Fielding, was whipped for fraud, the courts and the press of the time do not seem to have believed she committed any crimes. Terry Castle contends that English law in the eighteenth century ignored female homosexual activity not out of indifference, but out of male fears about acknowledging and reifying lesbianism.

The literature of the time attempted to rationalize some lesbian activities, commonly searching for visible indications of sapphic tendencies. In The New Atlantis, the "real" lesbians are depicted as being masculine. However, Catherine Craft-Fairchild argues in "Sexual and Textual Indeterminacy: Eighteenth-Century English Representations of Sapphism" (2006) that Delariviere Manley fails to establish a coherent narrative of lesbians as anatomically distinct from other women, whereas Fielding in The Female Husband focuses on the corruption of Hamilton's mind. Jonathan Swift, writing for the Tatler in 1711, acknowledges the difficulty inherent in establishing such a narrative framework, where he describes a woman having her virginity tested by a lion. Despite the onlookers' failure to detect anything amiss, the lion identified her as "no true Virgin." At the same time, positive -- or potentially positive writings -- concerning female homosexuality drew on the languages of both female same-sex friendship and heterosexual romance. At the time, there were no widespread cultural motifs of homosexuality. Only among the less respectable members of society does it seem that there was any sort of a lesbian subculture. It is likely that there was such a subculture amongst dancers and prostitutes in eighteenth- and early-nineteenth century Paris as well as in eighteenth-century Amsterdam.

France 
The late nineteenth and early twentieth centuries also saw an increase in lesbian visibility in France, both in the public sphere and in art and literature. Fin de siecle society in Paris included bars, restaurants and cafes frequented and owned by lesbians, such as Le Hanneton and Le Rat Mort. Private salons, like the one hosted by the American expatriate Nathalie Barney, drew many lesbian and bisexual artists and writers, including Julie d'Aubigny, Romaine Brooks, Renee Vivien, Colette, Djuna Barnes, Gertrude Stein, and Radclyffe Hall. One of Barney's lovers, the courtesan Liane de Pougy, published a best-selling novel based on their romance called l'Idylle Saphique (1901). Many publicly acknowledged lesbians and bisexual women were entertainers and actresses. Some, like the writer Colette and her lover Mathilde de Morny, performed lesbian theatrical scenes in cabarets; these drew outrage and censorship. Descriptions of lesbian salons, cafes and restaurants were included in tourist guides and journalism of the era. These guides and articles also mentioned houses of prostitution that were uniquely for lesbians. Henri de Toulouse-Lautrec created paintings of many of the lesbians he met, some of whom frequented or worked at the famed Moulin Rouge.

The 18th century lesbian secret society named "Sect of Anandrynes" included peoples like; Marie Thérèse Louise of Savoy, Princesse de Lamballe, Yolande de Polastron, Mlle Raucourt, Sophie Arnould, Marie Antoinette.

Ireland

Lady Frances Brudenell, Countess of Newburgh, was an Irish aristocrat known as the subject of a satire in which she was portrayed as the leader of a society of lesbians.

The "Ladies of Llangollen", Eleanor Butler (1739–1829) and Sarah Ponsonby (1755–1831), were two upper-class Irish women whose relationship scandalised and fascinated their contemporaries. The pair moved to a Gothic house in Llangollen, North Wales, in 1780 after leaving Ireland to escape the social pressures of conventional marriages.

England

There was alleged lesbian relationship between Anne, Queen of Great Britain and her courtier Abigail Masham, Baroness Masham.

Anne Seymour Damer, was an English sculptor. Once described as a 'female genius' by Horace Walpole, she was trained in sculpture by Giuseppe Ceracchi and John Bacon. Influenced by the Enlightenment movement, Anne was an author, traveller, theatrical producer and actress, as well as an acclaimed sculptress. She exhibited regularly at The Royal Academy from 1784 to 1818. She was a close friend to members of Georgian high society, including Horace Walpole and the Whig politician Charles James Fox. It is believed that Damer was a lesbian and was in a relationship with the actress Elizabeth Farren.

Catherina Boevey was a lesbian philanthropist.

Lady Catherine Jones' decision not to marry, and her close relationships and cohabitation with women throughout her life and into her death, merit speculation that she was a lesbian. The frustratingly minimal surviving documentation of her life make this difficult to assert with confidence. Nevertheless, one can make logical connections that the 'close union' she shared with Kendall, and with Astell, were not entirely platonic.

Germany 
Catharina Margaretha Linck was a Prussian woman who for most of her adult life presented herself as a man. She married a woman and, based on their sexual activity together, was convicted of sodomy and executed by order of King Frederick William I in 1721. Linck's execution was the last for lesbian sexual activity in Europe and an anomaly for its time.

Sweden 
The question of Christina, Queen of Sweden's sexuality has been debated, even as a number of modern biographers generally consider her to have been a lesbian, and her relationships with women were noted during her lifetime; Christina seems to have written passionate letters to Ebba Sparre, and Guilliet suggested a relationship between Christina and Gabrielle de Rochechouart de Mortemart, Rachel, a niece of Diego Teixeira, and the singer Angelina Giorgino. Some historians assert she maintained non-sexual, lesbian, or bisexual relationships during the course of her life depending on which source is consulted. According to Veronica Buckley, Christina was a "dabbler" who was "painted a lesbian, a prostitute, a hermaphrodite, and an atheist" by her contemporaries, though "in that tumultuous age, it is hard to determine which was the most damning label".

Italy 
Laudomia Forteguerri was an accomplished Italian poet and a member of one of the most powerful families in the sixteenth-century Republic of Siena. She is considered by some historians to be Italy's earliest lesbian writer, and she was famous for her beauty, wit, and intelligence. In January 1553, Forteguerri led a group of women in helping with the construction of a defensive bastion to protect her city against an anticipated attack from Imperial Spanish forces. The attack and siege that followed in 1554–55 ultimately lead to the fall of the independent Republic. Forteguerri became a legendary figure in Sienese history and her legacy has lived on long after her death.

Spain 
Eleno de Céspedes, was a Spanish surgeon who married a man and later a woman, and was tried by the Spanish Inquisition. Céspedes may have been an intersex and/or transgender person, or, if a woman, may have been a lesbian and/or the first female surgeon known in Spain and perhaps in Europe.

Princess Isabella of Parma found more fulfillment in her relationship with her sister-in-law, Archduchess Maria Christina.

Colonial America and the United States 
In colonial American history, laws against lesbianism were suggested but not created or enforced. In 1636, John Cotton proposed a law which would make sex between two women (or two men) in Massachusetts Bay a capital offense, but the law was not enacted. It would have read, "Unnatural filthiness, to be punished with death, whether sodomy, which is carnal fellowship of man with man, or woman with woman, or buggery, which is carnal fellowship of man or woman with beasts or fowls." In 1655, the Connecticut Colony suggested a law against sodomy between women (as well as between men), but it did not take effect. 

In 1779, Thomas Jefferson proposed a law stating that "Whosoever shall be guilty of rape, polygamy, or sodomy with man or woman shall be punished, if a man, by castration, if a woman, by cutting thro' the cartilage of her nose a hole of one half inch diameter at the least", but the proposal failed. However, Sarah White Norman and Mary Vincent Hammon in 1649 in Plymouth Colony were prosecuted for "lewd behavior with each other upon a bed." Their trial documents are the only known record of sex between female English colonists in North America in the seventeenthth century. Hammon was only admonished, perhaps because she was under sixteen, but in 1650 Norman was convicted and required to publicly acknowledge her "unchaste behavior" with Hammon. She was also warned against future offenses. This is the only known example of the prosecution of female homosexual activities in United States history.

Close intimate relationships were common among women in the mid-nineteenth century. This was attributed to strict gender roles that led women to expand their social circle to other women for emotional support. These relationships were expected to form close between women with similar socioeconomic status. Since there was not defined language in regards to lesbianism at the time, these relationships were seen as merely homosocial. Though women developed very close emotional relationships with one another, marriage to men was still the norm. However, there is evidence of possible sexual relationships beyond an emotional level. Documents from two African-American women describe practices known as "bosom sex." While these women practiced heterosexuality with their husbands, it is still believed their relationship was romantic and sexual.

The late nineteenth century and early twentieth century saw the flourishing of "Boston marriages" in New England. The term describes romantic friendship between two women, living together without any financial support from men. Many lasting romantic friendships began at women's colleges. This kind of relationship actually predates the New England custom, as there have been examples of this in the United Kingdom and continental Europe since the seventeenth century. Belief in the platonic nature of Boston marriages began to dissipate after followers of Freud cast suspicion on the supposed innocent friendships of  the "marriages."

Later 20th and early 21st centuries (1969–present)

The Stonewall Riots were a series of spontaneous demonstrations, when members of the gay (i.e. LGBT) community fought back when police became violent during a police raid in the early morning hours of June 28, 1969, at the Stonewall Inn, located in the Greenwich Village neighborhood of Manhattan, New York City. The crowd was spurred to action when butch lesbian Stormé DeLarverie punched the police officer who had struck her over the head, and called out to the crowd, "Why don't you guys do something?" These riots are widely considered to constitute the single most important event leading to the gay liberation movement in the US, and one of the most important events in the modern fight for LGBT rights in the United States.

Political lesbianism originated in the late 1960s among second wave radical feminists as a way to fight sexism and compulsory heterosexuality (see Adrienne Rich's essay Compulsory Heterosexuality and Lesbian Existence). Sheila Jeffreys, a lesbian, helped to develop the concept when she co-wrote "Love Your Enemy? The Debate Between Heterosexual Feminism and Political Lesbianism" with the Leeds Revolutionary Feminist Group. They argued that women should abandon support of heterosexuality and stop sleeping with men, encouraging women to rid men "from your beds and your heads." While the main idea of political lesbianism is to be separate from men, this does not necessarily mean that political lesbians have to sleep with women; some choose to be celibate or identify as asexual. The Leeds Revolutionary Feminist Group definition of a political lesbian is "a woman identified woman who does not fuck men". They proclaimed men the enemy and women who were in relationships with them collaborators and complicit in their own oppression. Heterosexual behavior was seen as the basic unit of the patriarchy's political structure, with lesbians who reject heterosexual behavior therefore disrupting the established political system. Lesbian women who have identified themselves as "political lesbians" include Ti-Grace Atkinson, Julie Bindel, Charlotte Bunch, Yvonne Rainer, and Sheila Jeffreys.

On December 15, 1973, the American Psychiatric Association voted almost unanimously to remove “homosexuality” from the list of psychiatric disorders that is included in the group’s Diagnostic and Statistical Manual of Mental Disorders. This reversal came after three years of protests from gay and lesbian liberation activists and major disruption at the group’s panel on homosexuality in 1970.

In 1974, Maureen Colquhoun came out as the first lesbian MP for the Labour Party in the UK. When elected she was in a heterosexual marriage.

Lesbian feminism, which was most influential from the mid-1970s to the mid-1980s (primarily in North America and Western Europe), encourages women to direct their energies toward other women rather than men, and often advocates lesbianism as the logical result of feminism. Some key thinkers and activists in lesbian feminism are Charlotte Bunch, Rita Mae Brown, Adrienne Rich, Audre Lorde, Marilyn Frye, Mary Daly, Sheila Jeffreys and Monique Wittig (although the latter is more commonly associated with the emergence of queer theory). Into the mid 1970s, lesbians around the world were publishing their personal coming out stories, as these came few and far between at the time. In addition to coming out stories, lesbians were publishing biographies of lesbian writers who were misplaced in history, looking for examples of who they were and how their community came to be. As with Gay Liberation, the lesbian feminist understanding of the lesbian potential in all women was at odds with the minority-rights framework of the Gay Rights movement. Many women of the Gay Liberation movement felt frustrated at the domination of the movement by men and formed separate organizations; some who felt gender differences between men and women could not be resolved developed "lesbian separatism", influenced by writings such as Jill Johnston's 1973 book Lesbian Nation. Disagreements between different political philosophies were, at times, extremely heated, and became known as the lesbian sex wars, clashing in particular over views on sadomasochism, prostitution and transgenderism. The “Sex Wars” was a time in feminist history that divided “anti-pornography” and “pro-sex” feminists. The common belief among pro-sex feminists was that there needed to be a new way for female desire to be advertised and demonstrated. General photography of women in this manner was debated among feminists everywhere.

In the Eastern Bloc, although there were no standard laws regarding discrimination against gays and lesbian, self-expression was discouraged as it encouraged people toward actions that were outside the accepted norms of a harmonious socialist society. As such, state police often used blackmail and kept dossiers on homosexual people as a way for them to be manipulated by the state. Activists in Eastern Europe were not unaware of events in the West, but generally forming associations for any type of special interest group was forbidden until the 1980s. Because state sanction was not given, many support systems for lesbians operated clandestinely. The Sunday Club would not gain official sanction and an ability to register as an organization until 1990. It was organized in 1988 at the Ipoly Cinema, a venue where Ildikó Juhász operated an after-hours safe space for lesbians to come together to create social networks.

The Lesbian Avengers began in New York City in 1992 as "a direct action group focused on issues vital to lesbian survival and visibility." Dozens of other chapters quickly emerged worldwide, a few expanding their mission to include questions of gender, race, and class. Newsweek reporter Eloise Salholz, covering the 1993 March on Washington for Lesbian, Gay and Bi Equal Rights and Liberation, believed the Lesbian Avengers were so popular because they were founded at a moment when lesbians were increasingly tired of working on issues, like AIDS and abortion, while their own problems went unsolved. Most importantly, lesbians were frustrated with invisibility in society at large, and invisibility and misogyny in the LGBT community.

Many activists in the 21st century have attempted to create more visibility for lesbian history and the activists that brought it to light. They argue that LGBTQ history is not nearly as represented as other civil rights movements, including African American's or women's civil and equal rights. Activists and other volunteers around the country have attempted to collect historical artifacts, documents, and other stories to help preserve this history for generations in the future to celebrate and cherish. Also in the 21st century, there has been an increased movement for LGBTQ+ visibility in school curriculums. The exclusion of the LGBTQ+ community and its history is one of the biggest contributors to homophobia and the exclusion of those a part of the LGBTQ community in schools.

See also
History of lesbianism in the United States
List of lesbian, gay, bisexual, or transgender firsts by year
Timeline of LGBT history
Lesbian erasure

Notes

References

Further reading

External links 

Lesbian history
Lesbianism